Narcissus is a 2012 film written and directed by Dovile Gasiunaite. In Greek mythology, Narcissus was a handsome young man, so vain that the gods condemned him to fall in love with his own reflection. Nowadays, Narcissistic personality disorder (NPD) is a pathological preoccupation with issues of self-importance, closely connected to ego-centrism.

In the original screenplay by Dovile Gasiunaite, Teodore is a handsome and gifted string quartet cello player, who becomes increasingly obsessed with himself. His looks, sensitivity, and talent initially draw people in, but his lack of empathy and self-obsession hurt everyone around him. Teodore abandons his family, career, and friends in his quest for an unattainable challenge. His devastating battle takes place in the dark place of his own psyche.

Music
The film's music score was written by Giedrius Puskunigis, and performed by actors who are also professional musicians. Amvrosios Vlachopoulos, the leading actor, is a professional cello player. Susanna Perry Gilmore is currently a first violin and concertmaster at Omaha Symphony.

Awards and nominations
 Best Feature Film, Nominated, Silver Crane Awards (Lithuanian Film Academy)
 Best Music, Nominated, Silver Crane Awards (Lithuanian Film Academy)
 Best Supporting Actress, Nominated, Silver Crane Awards (Lithuanian Film Academy)
 Audience Choice Award, Kaunas International Film Festival, 2012

External links
 Official film’s website
 Film Trailer
 Official Facebook Page

References
 Kaunas International Film Festival
 Lithuanian Film Center
 Lithuanian Film Academy
 Omaha Symphony

2012 films
Lithuanian drama films
Films about classical music and musicians
Lithuanian-language films